José Leandro de Souza (born 14 May 1985), known as Zé Leandro, is a Brazilian footballer who last played for Paraná Clube for whom he signed in January 2009.
He previously played for Sociedade Esportiva Matsubara, Metallurg Donetsk and FC Arsenal Kyiv.

References

1985 births
Living people
Brazilian footballers
Brazilian expatriate footballers
FC Metalurh Donetsk players
FC Arsenal Kyiv players
Paraná Clube players
Ukrainian Premier League players
Association football midfielders
Expatriate footballers in Ukraine
Brazilian expatriate sportspeople in Ukraine